Brachycyon is an extinct genus of terrestrial carnivores belonging to the suborder Caniformia, family Amphicyonidae ("bear dog"), which inhabited Eurasia and North America.

 Brachycyon was named by Filhol (1872). It was assigned to Amphicyonidae by Carroll (1988).

References

Miocene bear dogs
Miocene mammals of North America
Miocene mammals of Europe
Miocene mammals of Asia
Bear dogs
Prehistoric carnivoran genera